Vadakkekarayil Koran Bharathan (16 January 1929- 19 August 2015), better known as Paravoor Bharatan was an Indian actor who acted in Malayalam films. He started his career in movies during the 1950s. Bharathan is known as a versatile actor and has played a variety of roles including negative roles, character roles and comedy roles.

Life 
Bharathan was born to Vadakkekarayil Kochannan Koran and Kurumbakutty in 1929 at Vavakkad, Moothakunnam in North Paravoor, Cochin. He went to S.N.M. High School, Moothakunnam but, had to discontinue his studies when his father died. His father was a coconut plucker and mother was a coir maker. His father died when he was very young and his mother took care of him.

He used to act during his school days as well. On one occasion, he caught the eye of Kedamangalam Sadanandan, a noted Kathaprasangam artiste, who introduced him to the state troupe - Pushpitha during mid-1940s. He started acting in stage shows in and around Paravoor. He has also performed dramas in actor Jose Prakash's drama troupe.

When the play Rakthabandham was being made into a film, Vijayabhanu recommended Bharathan's name for a role. The movie released in 1951 and was directed by Vel Swamy. It had Cherthala Vasudeva Kurup, Ambalapuzha Meenakshi, S. D. Subbiah and others in main roles. Bharathan went on to act in films like Kerala Kesari and Marumakal.

Bharathan spent a good amount of his early life as a stage actor. The turning point was his comic role in the play Maattoli in the early 50s. Acting alongside Bharathan in this play was Thankamani (she played a cameo in Neelakuyil), whom he later married. Parethante Vilapam was the last telefilm and Changathikoottam released in 2009 was the last film he acted in.

Family
He was married to Thankamani. They have four children Pradeep, Madhu, Ajayan and Bindu.

Death
Bharathan died on 19 August 2015 morning at his home in Paravoor. He was suffering from various
age-related ailments and was under treatment. He was a well talented actor of Malayalam film industry. Incidentally he died the same day the 1965 film Chemmeen (in which he acted a role) completed 50 years of its release.

Awards
 2004 Bahadoor Award

Filmography
He has acted in more than 1000 films. This list contains only a few hundred of the actual.

 2009 - Changathikoottam
 2003 - Njan Salperu Ramankutty
 2003 - Arimpara
 2003 - C.I.D. Moosa
 2003 - Mazhanoolkkanavu as Varma
 2002 - Swararaga Ganga
 2001 - Achaneyanenikkishtam
 2001 - Chithrathoonukal
 2000 - Mazhanoolkanavu
 1998 - Kusruthi Kuruppu
 1997 - Aniathipravu as Udayavarma Thampuran
 1997 - Junior Mandrake 
 1996 - Aramana Veedum Anjoorekkarum  
 1996 - Saamoohyapadom   
 1995 - Spadikam as Joseph 
 1995 - Thirumanassu as Nandan's Father
 1995 - Aniyan Bava Chetan Bava as Premachandran's father
 1995 - Achan Kombathu Amma Varampathu
 1994 - Pingami 
 1994 - Moonam Loka Pattalam
 1994 - Pavam I. A. Ivachan
 1994 - Manathe Kottaram
 1994 - Bharya 
 1994 - Kudumba Visesham  
 1994 - Varabhalam 
 1993 - Meleparambil Aanveedu as Paramashivan 
 1993 - Bandhukkal Sathrukkal as Appukkuttan 
 1993 - Customs Diary
 1993 - Ammayane Sathyam as Iyer   
 1993 - Sthalathe Pradhana Payyans .
as Minister   
 1992 - Ente Ponnu Thampuran  
 1992 - Ellarum Chollanu 
 1992 - Aparatha 
 1991 - Mookkilyarajyathu  
 1991 - Godfather as Anappara Parasuraman 
 1991 - Ganamela as K. S. Pillai
 1991 - Ottayal Pattalam
 1991 - Pookkalam Varavayi
 1991 - Amina Tailors as Vaasu
 1991 - Ennum Nanmakal
 1991 - Aakasha Kottayile Sultan 
 1990 - Gajakesariyogam as Khader 
 1990 - Sasneham  
 1990 - Varthamanakaalam as Thommachan
 1990 - In Harihar Nagar 
 1990 - Thalayanamanthram as Contractor 
 1990 - Nammude Naadu as Govinda Kuruppu  
 1990 - Dr. Pasupathy as Kurup
 1990 - Kadathanadan Ambadi
 1990 - Shubhayathra
 1990 - Kalikkalam
 1990 - Marupuram
 1990 - Pavam Pavam Rajakumaran
 1990 - Vidhyarambham
 1990 - His Highness Abdullah  
 1989 - Peruvannapurathe Visheshangal  
 1989 - Mazhavilkavadi as Vasu  
 1989 - Mudra  
 1989 - Mrigaya 
 1989 - Jagratha  
 1989 - Kodungallur Bhagavathi 
 1988 - Pattanapravesham   
 1988 - Janmandharam as Kittu
 1988 - Moonnam Mura 
 1988 - Ponmuttayidunna Tharavu 
 1987 - Idanaazhiyil Oru Kaalocha as Vattoly Thomachan
 1988 - Abkari  
 1986 - Doore Doore Oru Koodu Koottam   
 1986 - Snehamulla Simham  
 1986 - Nyayavidhi  
 1986 - Oru Yugasandhya
 1986 - Sayam Sandhya as Iyer
 1985 - Muhurtham Pathnonnu Muppathinu as Dr. Warrier  
 1985 - Janakeeya Kodathi  
 1985 - Anubandham   
 1985 - Ee Lokam Ivide Kure Manushyar  
 1985 - Iniyum Kadha Thudarum as
 1985 - Oru Kudakeezhil as Potti
 1985 - Oru Sandesham Koodi
 1985 - Aviduthe Pole Ivideyum
 1985 - Anakkorumma as Police officer
 1985 - Ambada Njane
 1985 - Kannaram Pothi Pothi as Murali
 1985 - Onnigu Vannenkil
 1985 - Idanilangal
 1984 - Adiyozhukkukal  
 1984 - Unaroo 
 1983 - Naanayam  
 1983 - Iniyenkilum 
 1983 - Kuyiline Thedi
 1983 - Changatham
 1983 - Mandanmar Londonil as Kuttappan
 1982 - Kurukkante Kalyanam
 1982 - Mylanji as Karim
 1982 - Raktha Sakshi
 1982 - Anuraagakkodathi as Kunjunni
 1982 - Ayudham
 1982 - Enikkum Oru Divasam as Chandrika's father
 1982 - Padayottam as Mammootty 
 1982 - Ee Nadu as Bharathan
 1981 - Sahasam
 1981 - Ellam Ninakku Vendi as Panchayat President
 1981 - Avatharam as Velichappadu
 1981 - Orikkal Koodi 
 1980 - Karimpana
 1980 - Theekadal as Kochu
 1980 - Ivar
 1980 - Rajaneegandhi as Shivaraman
 1980 - Kochu Kochu Thettukal
 1980 - Muthuchippikal as Velu
 1980 - Meen 
 1979 - Neeyo Njaano as Sankara Pilla
 1979 - Jimmy as Varghese
 1979 - Valeduthavan Valal
 1979 - Enikku Njaan Swantham as Mohan's father
 1979 - Kaliyankkattu Neeli
 1979 - Ezhunirangal as Sankunni
 1979 - Irumbazhikal as Raghavan
 1978 - Thacholi Ambu
 1978 - Brashttu
 1978 - Midukki Ponnamma
 1978 - Kanalkattakal as Govindan
 1978 - Kudumbam Namukku Sreekovil as Karadi Kuttappan 
 1978 - Velluvili as Naanu
 1977 - Aval Oru Devalayam
 1977 - Chathurvedam
 1977 - Ormakal Marikumo
 1977 - Aparadhi  as Raman Nair
 1977 - Kaduvaye Pidicha Kiduva
 1977 - Agninakshathram
 1977 - Ormakal Marikkumo as Narayanan
 1977 - Guruvayoor Keshavan
 1977 - Vezhambal
 1977 - Anugraham as Rowdi Kuttan nair
 1977 - Yatheem as Hameed
 1976 - Panchami
 1976 - Sexilla Stundilla
 1976 - Swimming Pool
 1976 - Themmadi Velappan as Chathu
 1976 - Priyamvada
 1975 - Kalyana Sougandikam
 1975 - Madhura Pathinezhu
 1975 - Love Letter
 1975 - Chandanachola
 1975 - Bharya Illatha Rathri
 1975 - Kalyanapanthal
 1975 - Muchittukalikkarante Makal
 1975 - Hello Darling as Sekhar
 1975 - Chuvanna Sandhakal
 1975 - Abhimanam
 1975 - Ayodhya as Kittu Panikkar
 1974 - Rajahamsam
 1974 - Vishnu Vijayam
 1974 - Nadanmare Avashamundu
 1974 - College Girl as Kittunni
 1974 - Chakravakam as Devassia
 1974 - Ankathattu
 1974 - Thumbolarcha as Kunjuneeli's father
 1974 - Rahasya Rathri
 1974 - Youvanam as Mathew
 1973 - Nakhangal
 1973 - Panchavadi as Manager Kumar
 1973 - Kaapalika as Adibharamantha Swami/Antony
 1973 - Anjathavasam as Rajappan
 1973 - Ladies Hostel as Vakkeel Pillai
 1973 - Sasthram Jayichu Manushyan Thottu as Sreedhara Menon
 1973 - Football Champion
 1973 - Ponnapuram Kotta
 1973 - Dharmayudham as Appunni
 1973 - Masappadi Mathupilla
 1973 - Kaliyugam
 1973 - Thottavadi as Madhavan
 1973 - Divya Darshanam
 1973 - Urvashi Bharathi
 1973 - Thaniniram as Kozhi Krishnan/Aathmanantha Guru Swami
 1972 - Devi
 1972 - Manushya Bandhagal
 1972 - Vidharthikale Ithile Ithile
 1972 - Mayiladumkunnu
 1972 - Iniyoru Janmam Tharoo
 1972 - Gandharavakshetram as Govinda Menon
 1972 - Postmane Kaanmanilla
 1972 - Chembarathi as Rasheed
 1972 - Shakthi
 1972 - Maravil Thirivu Sookshikkuka ...Wan Lan/Esthappan
 1972 - Mantrakodi
 1972 - Panimudakku as Mohammed
 1972 - Punarjanmam
 1972 - Maaya
 1971 - Oru Penninte Kadha
 1971 - Panchavankadu
 1971 - Karakanakadal as Ekkoyi
 1971 - Inquilab Sindabad
 1971 - Sindooracheppu as Kittu Kurup
 1971 - Thettu as Kurian
 1971 - Kochaniyathi as Soman
 1971 - Lanka Dahanam
 1971 - Anubhavangal Paalichakal
 1971 - Shiksha as Pankan Pilla
 1971 - Marunattil Oru Malayali as Kariyachan
 1970 - Olavum Theeravum
 1970 - Nizhalattom as Abraham
 1970 - Cross Belt as Kaduva Narayanapilla
 1970 - Aranaazhikaneram as Kochukutty
 1970 - Bheekara Nimishangal as Mathai
 1970 - Lottery Ticket
 1970 - Priya
 1970 - Triveni as Mathai
 1970 - Mindapennu as Kunjappan
 1970 - Ambalapravu
 1970 - Vazhve Mayam as Swami
 1970 - Kurukshetram
 1969 - Danger Biscuit as Chellappanashari
 1969 - Rahasyam as Vikraman
 1969 - Aalmaram
 1969- Balatha Pahayan as Adraan
 1969 - Rest House
 1969 - Mooladhanam as Naanu
 1969 - Velliyazhcha as Velu Pilla
 1969 - Mister Kerala
 1969 - Adimakal as Unnithan
 1969 - Kannoor Deluxe as Manager
 1969 - Kallichellamma as Vasu
 1969 - Nadi
 1969 - Vila Kuranja Manushyar
 1969 - Padicha kallan
 1968 - Bharyamar Sookhikkuka as Dileep
 1968 - Anchu Sundarikal
 1968 - Hotel High Range as Vaasu
 1968 - Viplavakarikal as Sankaran
 1968 - Thulabharam
 1966 - Kattumallika
 1966 - Kalyanarathriyil
 1965 - Chemmeen 
 1965 - Kattuppokkal as Vareechan
 1965 - Karutha Kai as Khader
 1965 - Kadathukaran as Bhadran
 1965 - Kaliyodam
 1965 - Rajamalli
 1965 - Mayavi as Police officer
 1965 - Bhoomiyile Malakha
 1964 - Atom Bomb
 1964 - Althara
 1962 - Snehadeepam as Mohan
 1962 - Kalpadukal
 1961 - Christmas Rathri as Porinchu
 1961 - Unniyarcha
 1961 - Bhakta Kuchela
 1952 - Marumakal
 1951 - Kerala Kesari
 1951 - Rakthabandham

References

External links 
 http://en.msidb.org/displayProfile.php?category=actors&artist=Paravoor%20Bharathan&limit=173
 
 https://web.archive.org/web/20120404165205/http://popcorn.oneindia.in/artist/17716/1/paravoor-bharathan.html

Male actors from Kochi
Male actors in Malayalam cinema
Indian male film actors
1929 births
2015 deaths
20th-century Indian male actors
21st-century Indian male actors